Kentucky Route 1402 is a state highway that runs through a portion of eastern Warren County in south-central Kentucky. The road is known locally as Porter Pike.

Route description 

The route begins in Bowling Green at a junction with multiple cojoined routes, known locally as Louisville Road. KY 1402 then proceeds east through an area dotted by small businesses and new residential development for  before crossing under I-65 by way of an underpass.

Past this point, KY 1402 runs through an area lined largely by large rural estates and ranches. It continues east for another  before coming to a junction with KY 1297 in the Gott community.

The route then continues to the east for another  before reaching its eastern terminus at a junction with KY 101 near the Allen County line.

Major intersections

References

1402
1402